In mathematics, the characteristic of a ring , often denoted , is defined to be the smallest number of times one must use the ring's multiplicative identity (1) in a sum to get the additive identity (0). If this sum never reaches the additive identity the ring is said to have characteristic zero. 

That is,  is the smallest positive number  such that: 

if such a number  exists, and  otherwise.

Motivation
The special definition of the characteristic zero is motivated by the equivalent definitions characterized in the next section, where the characteristic zero is not required to be considered separately.

The characteristic may also be taken to be the exponent of the ring's additive group, that is, the smallest positive integer  such that:

for every element  of the ring (again, if  exists; otherwise zero). Some authors do not include the multiplicative identity element in their requirements for a ring (see Multiplicative identity and the term "ring"), and this definition is suitable for that convention; otherwise the two definitions are equivalent due to the distributive law in rings.

Equivalent characterizations 
 The characteristic is the natural number  such that  contains a subring isomorphic to the factor ring , which is the image of the above homomorphism.

Case of rings
This can sometimes be used to exclude the possibility of certain ring homomorphisms. The only ring with characteristic 1 is the zero ring, which has only a single element  If a nontrivial ring  does not have any nontrivial zero divisors, then its characteristic is either  or prime. In particular, this applies to all fields, to all integral domains, and to all division rings. Any ring of characteristic  is infinite.

The ring  of integers modulo  has characteristic .

A -algebra is equivalently a ring whose characteristic divides . This is because for every ring  there is a ring homomorphism , and this map factors through  if and only if the characteristic of  divides . In this case for any  in the ring, then adding  to itself  times gives .

The map  then defines a ring homomorphism  It is called the Frobenius homomorphism. If  is an integral domain it is injective.

Case of fields  

As mentioned above, the characteristic of any field is either  or a prime number. A field of non-zero characteristic is called a field of finite characteristic or positive characteristic or prime characteristic.

Any field  has a unique minimal subfield, also called its . This subfield is isomorphic to either the rational number field  or a finite field  of prime order. Two prime fields of the same characteristic are isomorphic, and this isomorphism is unique. In other words, there is essentially a unique prime field in each characteristic.

Fields of characteristic zero 
The most common fields of characteristic zero are the subfields of the complex numbers. The p-adic fields are characteristic zero fields that are widely used in number theory. They have absolute values which are very different from those of complex numbers.

Thus, every algebraic number field and the field of complex numbers  are of characteristic zero.

Fields of prime characteristic 
The finite field GF() has characteristic p.

There exist infinite fields of prime characteristic.

Since in that case it contains  it is also a vector space over that field, and from linear algebra we know that the sizes of finite vector spaces over finite fields are a power of the size of the field. This also shows that the size of any finite vector space is a prime power.

Notes

References

Sources

 

Ring theory
Field (mathematics)